Sarah Anne Coakley  (born 1951) is an English Anglican priest, systematic theologian and philosopher of religion with interdisciplinary interests. She is an honorary professor at the Logos Institute, the University of St Andrews, after she stepped down as Norris–Hulse Professor of Divinity (2007–2018) at the University of Cambridge. She is also a visiting professorial fellow at the Australian Catholic University, both in Melbourne and  Rome.

Early life and education
Born as Sarah Anne Furber on 10 September 1951 into a wealthy family of lawyers in Blackheath, London, Coakley attended Blackheath High School. Following this, she spent a gap year teaching English and Latin in Lesotho.  Her education continued at New Hall (now Murray Edwards College), University of Cambridge (BA, first-class honours, 1973), and at Harvard Divinity School (ThM, 1975), to which she went as a Harkness Fellow. Her PhD on Ernst Troeltsch is also from the University of Cambridge (1983).

Career

Academic career
Coakley has taught at Lancaster University (1976–1991), Oriel College, Oxford (1991–1993) and  Harvard University in the divinity school (1993–2007; as Mallinckrodt Professor of Divinity, 1995–2007). She was a visiting professor of religion at Princeton University (2003–2004).

In 2006, she was elected the Norris–Hulse Professor of Divinity at the University of Cambridge (the first woman appointed to this chair) and took up the position in 2007. In 2011, she became deputy chair of the School of Arts and Humanities with a four-year appointment on the general board of the university. She stepped down as Norris–Hulse Professor in 2018 and was made professor emeritus. She has been an honorary professor at the Logos Institute and the University of St Andrews since 2018 and a visiting professorial fellow at the Australian Catholic University since 2019.

Coakley's teaching and research interests cover a number of disciplines cognate to systematic theology, including the philosophy of religion, the philosophy of science, patristics, feminist theory and the intersections of law and medicine with religion. Her contributions to these areas have generally been by way of co-ordinating research projects and editing or co-editing collections of papers. It was through these collaborative projects that her profile gained a level of international prominence. At the time of her appointment to the Norris–Hulse chair in Cambridge, Coakley had not published a monograph subsequent to the 1988 publication of her doctoral thesis. She has been working on a four-volume systematic theology, the first volume of which was published in 2013 as God, Sexuality and the Self: An Essay On the Trinity.

With mathematician and biologist Martin Nowak, Coakley co-founded Harvard University's Program for Evolutionary Studies with funding from pedophile and sex offender Jeffrey Epstein. Coakley has written extensively on the subject of science and religion as existing in parallel social constructs (for example, the concepts of Darwinism, fatalism or nature, nurture), and is the author of 2013's Evolution, Games, and God: The Principle of Cooperation, edited by Nowak.

From 2005-08, Coakley co-directed, with Martin A. Nowak, the "Evolution and Theology of Cooperation" project at Harvard University sponsored by the Templeton Foundation, out of which has come a co-edited volume, Evolution, Games, and God: The Principle of Cooperation. An earlier interdisciplinary project on "Pain and Its Transformations", undertaken with Arthur Kleinman at Harvard (as part of the Mind, Brain, Behavior Initiative), produced Pain and Its Transformations: The Interface of Biology and Culture (co-ed. with Kay Kaufman Shelemay, Harvard UP, 2007).

She delivered the Gifford Lectures in Aberdeen, Scotland, in 2012.

She holds honorary degrees from Lund University, St Andrews, University of St Michael's College, Toronto, and Heythrop College, London. In July 2019, she was elected a Fellow of the British Academy (FBA), the United Kingdom's national academy for the humanities and social sciences.

Ordained ministry
Coakley was ordained in the Church of England as a deacon in 2000 and as a priest in 2001. She has assisted in parishes in Waban, Massachusetts, and at the Church of St Mary and St Nicholas, Littlemore, Oxford, England (where she served her title). Her training for the priesthood included periods working in a hospital and a prison. In 2011 she was appointed an honorary canon of Ely Cathedral where she assisted with the morning office and Eucharist. (Note: as of June 2019, Ely Cathedral no longer lists Coakley as an honorary canon.) Coakley now lives in the US, but returns to the UK every year for a period of summer vacation during which she has permission to officiate at St Barnabas Church, Jericho, Oxford

In 2012, she was involved in an unsuccessful attempt to change Church of England rules to allow women to become bishops.

Personal life
In 1975, Coakley married James F. Coakley, a Syriac scholar and fine printer. They have two daughters, Edith Coakley Stowe and Agnes Coakley Cox, who attended Buckingham Browne & Nichols school in Cambridge, Massachusetts. Her brother is a legal adviser to King Charles.  Her father, a wealthy lawyer and bon viveur, died in September 2016.

Published works

Books authored

Books edited
 The Making and Remaking of Christian Doctrine: Essays in Honour of Maurice Wiles. Edited with Pailin, David. Oxford: Clarendon Press. 1993. .
 Religion and the Body. Editor. Cambridge, England: Cambridge University Press. 1997. 
 Re-Thinking Gregory of Nyssa. Editor. Oxford: Blackwell Publishing. 2003. .
 Pain and Its Transformations: The Interface of Biology and Culture. Edited with Shelemay, Kay Kaufman. Cambridge, Massachusetts: Harvard University Press. 2007. .
 Praying for England: Priestly Presence in Contemporary Culture. Edited with Wells, Samuel. London: Continuum. 2008. 
 Re-Thinking Dionysius the Areopagite. Edited with Stang, Charles M. Chichester, England: Wiley-Blackwell. 2009. 
 The Spiritual Senses: Perceiving God in Western Christianity. Edited with Gavrilyuk, Paul L. Cambridge, England: Cambridge University Press. 2012. . .
 Fear and Friendship: Anglicans Engaging with Islam. Edited with Ward, Frances. London: Continuum. 2012. .
Faith, Rationality and the Passions. Editor. Chichester, England: Wiley-Blackwell. 2012. .
 Evolution, Games and God: The Principle of Cooperation. Edited with Nowak, Martin A. Cambridge, Massachusetts: Harvard University Press. .
 For God's Sake: Re-Imagining Priesthood and Prayer in a Changing Church. Edited with Martin, Jessica. Norwich, England: Canterbury Press. .

See also

References

Footnotes

Bibliography

External links

2012 Gifford Lectures, including video
Interview for Faith & Leadership website, Duke University
Faculty page at Cambridge
List of Coakley's publications (.pdf)
St John's University Nottingham 'Timeline' Project YouTube Channel Sarah Coakley on the first volume of her systematic theology dedicated to the Trinity "God, Sexuality and the Self"

1951 births
20th-century Anglican theologians
20th-century English theologians
21st-century English Anglican priests
21st-century Anglican theologians
21st-century English theologians
Academics of Lancaster University
Academics of the University of St Andrews
Alumni of New Hall, Cambridge
Anglican philosophers
Anglo-Catholic clergy
Anglo-Catholic theologians
Christian feminist theologians
English Anglican theologians
English Anglo-Catholics
English feminist writers
Fellows of Murray Edwards College, Cambridge
Fellows of Oriel College, Oxford
Fellows of the British Academy
Feminist philosophers
Harvard Divinity School alumni
Harvard Divinity School faculty
Living people
Patristic scholars
People educated at Blackheath High School
Philosophers of religion
Philosophers of science
Religion and law
Systematic theologians
Women Christian theologians
Norris–Hulse Professors of Divinity